Suburban Strains is a 1980 musical by British playwright Alan Ayckbourn with music by Paul Todd. This was the first attempt Ayckbourn made at a musical since the ill-fated Jeeves! in 1975. It is about a teacher, Caroline, whose marriage to actor Kevin breaks down, only to find her new partner, doctor Matthew, even worse due to his control freakery, before making up with Kevin again.

References

 Suburban Stains on official Ayckbourn site
 Allen, Paul (2004) A Pocket Guide to Alan Ayckbourn Plays Faber & Faber 

Plays by Alan Ayckbourn
1980 plays